Otafest is an annual anime convention held in May (and previously September, mid-June, or early July), at the Telus Convention Centre, in Calgary, Alberta, Canada. The first Otafest was held 1999 and has expanded each year, including a move in 2009 to include a mini-convention called Otafest Lite, which was replaced in 2012 with Otafest Aurora. At the closing ceremonies in 2015, it was announced that Otafest would be moving to the Telus Convention Centre from the University of Calgary for Otafest 2016 with a new date, July 1–3, however the event dates returned to May after Otafest 2017. As of May 2015, it is the largest anime convention in Western Canada. Otafest is a fully volunteer-run non-profit, and has raised over $125,000 CAD for charitable initiatives since its inception.

Mandate 
Otafest is a Calgary-based nonprofit organization expressing the values of charity, quality, and transparency. The body of their activity pertains to the promotion of Japanese art, culture, and media in the Canadian community, and the organization rests firmly on the spirit of community collaboration and volunteerism.

History 
Otafest was scheduled to occur May 15–17, 2020 but was postponed to 2021 due to the coronavirus pandemic.

Otafest event history

Otafest Lite/Aurora event history

Otafest Lite

Otafest Aurora

References

External links
 Otafest website
 Dedicated Otaku Anime

Anime conventions in Canada
Recurring events established in 1999
Festivals in Calgary